Cross of Honour and Military Merit is a military decoration of Luxembourg established by Charlotte, Grand Duchess of Luxembourg in May 1951. The cross is awarded for distinguished service to the military in times of peace. In times of war the cross is awarded for outstanding acts of courage and bravery. The cross is awarded in three classes gilt, silver, and bronze.

References

Military awards and decorations of Luxembourg
Awards established in 1951
1951 establishments in Luxembourg